The 2022–23 season is Mezőkövesdi SE's 8th competitive season, 7th consecutive season in the OTP Bank Liga and 45th year in existence as a football club.

Transfers

Summer

In:

Out:

Source:

Winter

In:

Out:

Source:

Competitions

Overview

Nemzeti Bajnokság I

League table

Results summary

Results by round

Matches

Hungarian Cup

Statistics

Appearances and goals 
Last updated on 13 March 2023.

|-
|colspan="14"|Youth players:

|-
|colspan="14"|Out to loan:

|-
|colspan="14"|Players no longer at the club:

|}

Top scorers
Includes all competitive matches. The list is sorted by shirt number when total goals are equal.
Last updated on 13 March 2023

Disciplinary record
Includes all competitive matches. Players with 1 card or more included only.

Last updated on 13 March 2023

Clean sheets
Last updated on 13 March 2023

References

External links
 Official Website
 UEFA
 Fixtures and results

Mezőkövesdi SE seasons
Mezőkövesd